Test Track Centre near Żmigród is located in Węglewo in south-western Poland, some 3 km (2 mi) from Żmigród and some 50 km (30 mi) from Wrocław, near the Wrocław–Poznań railway line, with which it is connected by a spur. When opened in 1996, it was the only such facility in Poland. It is owned by the Railway Institute.

The facility is used to test rolling stock, overhead lines and electrification systems, and  railway tracks.

There are plans to add 1.5 kV DC and 15 and 25 kV AC overhead supply systems, and GSM-R and ETCS level 2 systems.

References

External links
 Official site (in English)
 Pesa Elf test ride

Railway test tracks
Trzebnica County
Buildings and structures in Greater Poland Voivodeship